Mount Bistre may refer to:

Mount Bistre (Alberta)
Mount Bistre (Antarctica)